Shanmukhapriya and Haripriya, popularly known as the Priya Sisters, are Carnatic music singers.

Early life
They hail originally from  Amalapuram in East Godavari District, Andhra Pradesh. They attended Little Flower School in Chittoor, Andhra Pradesh. They started learning Carnatic music from their father, Sri V.V.Subbaram, at an early age. In order to nurture their musical talent, their father shifted base to Chennai. Later they became the disciples of the renowned duo Radha and Jayalakshmi who were disciples of the legendary G. N. Balasubramaniam. They learnt many nuances and subtleties of music during the five-year tenure under Radha and Jayalakshmi including the advice that the singing should be so clear that the listener should be able to notate the entire kriti.

Career
Improving their repertoire was a major project and learning, a continuous process. Hence they joined Professor T.R.Subramaniam. They learnt many pallavis and kritis from him.

They are part of the  trend of duo singing in Carnatic music, which started in the 1950s, with performers like Radha Jayalakshmi, Soolamangalam Sisters and later continued by Bombay Sisters

References

External links
 Official site
 Artist Profiles : Shanmukha Priya and Hari Priya

Women Carnatic singers
Carnatic singers
People from East Godavari district
Sibling musical duos
Indian musical duos
Indian women classical singers
Singers from Andhra Pradesh
Women musicians from Andhra Pradesh
20th-century Indian singers
20th-century Indian women singers